Morelia is a Mexican telenovela produced by José Enrique Crousillat and Malú Crousillat for Televisa in 1995. Alpha Acosta and Arturo Peniche starred as protagonists, while Cecilia Bolocco starred as the main antagonist.

Plot
The story begins when the man who Morelia thinks is her father dies without revealing the secret of her true origin. A landowner in her hometown, Michoacán, harasses her and she is forced to run away. She arrives in Miami, where she has no choice but to work in a nightclub. During her first day at work, an insolent customer, Le Blanc goes too far with her. Morelia slaps him, and he accuses her of stealing his wallet after that.

Thanks to Carlos Montero, a lazy lawyer, she avoids going to jail, however she loses her job. Thus, Morelia begins to work as a maid at the Campos Miranda's residence, where she meets the oldest son, Jose Enrique. They fall in love, but their romance will be opposed by many.

Cast
 
Alpha Acosta as Morelia Solórzano Ríos/Morelia Montero Iturbide/Amanda Weiss
Arturo Peniche as José Enrique Campos Miranda
Cecilia Bolocco as Katrina Lafontaine Smith de Montero
Lupita Ferrer as Ofelia Campos Miranda de Santibáñez
Jorge Salinas as Alberto "Beto" Solórzano Ríos
Salvador Pineda as Federico Campos Miranda
Sergio Basañez as Luis Campos Miranda
Herminia Martínez  as Antonia Iturbide Pimentel Vda. de Campos Miranda
Norma Zúñiga as Mercedes
Raquel Montero as Luisiana Smith Vda. de Lafontaine
Javier Alberdi as Gustavo Santibáñez
Odalys García as Reina
Ana Margo as Kika
Ana Bertha Espín as Magdalena Ríos Vda. de Solórzano
Ramón Abascal as Germán Doré
Manuel Guízar as Avelino Robles
Patricia Noguera as Dania
Rene Lavan as Rony
Mario Martín as Benjamín Le Blanc
Marcela Cardona "Scarlata" as Jacqueline "Jackie" Campos Miranda Iturbide de Solórzano
Marisela González "Kanela" as Juanita
Humberto Rosenfeld as Tomy
Adriana Catano as "Esmeralda"
Eugenio Cobo as Arturo Solórzano
Juan Pablo Gamboa as Osvaldo Valenzuela
Mara Croatto as Sarah
Giselle Blondet as Liza Marsella
Daniel Alvarado as Lorenzo Campos Miranda
Fernando Carrera as Bosco Sartini
Raúl Durán as Efraín
Araceli Martínez as Mireya
Maritza Morgado as Lizette
Jorge Bustamante as Landa
Teresa Mayan as Carmita
Julio Martínez as Barbarito
Manolo Pérez Morales as Carlos
Nuri Flores as Lala
Liliana Rodríguez as Lulu
Armando Roblan as Calvo
Marta Velasco as Omara
Andy Mendez as Pillete
Yovana de la Cruz

Awards

References

External links

1995 telenovelas
Mexican telenovelas
1995 Mexican television series debuts
1995 American television series debuts
1996 Mexican television series endings
1996 American television series endings
Spanish-language American telenovelas
Spanish-language telenovelas
Television shows set in Florida
Television shows filmed in Miami
Televisa telenovelas
Univision telenovelas
Mexican television series based on Venezuelan television series